Paul Charles-René Landormy (3 January 1869 in Issy-les-Moulineaux – 17 November 1943 in Paris) was a French musicologist and music critic.

Biography 
Paul Landormy was a fellow student of philosopher Émile Chartier at Lycée Michelet (Vanves) and École Normale Supérieure of Paris.

An agrégé of philosophy, he learned singing with Giovanni Sbriglia (Italian tenor) and Pol Plançon (French bass).

He organized, with Romain Rolland, a series of lectures on the history of music at the École des hautes études sociales (1902) where he created a laboratory of acoustics that he directed during three years (1904–1907).

In addition, he became music critic for La Victoire, Le Figaro, wrote articles for Le Temps and several magazines.

Publications 
1910: Histoire de la musique, on Gallica
1920: Brahms, revised edition 1948),
1928: La Vie de Schubert
1929: Bizet 
 étude thématique sur le Faust de Gounod
1938: Albert Roussel
1941: Gluck
1942: Gounod
1943–1944: La musique française (3 volumes ; de la Marseillaise à la mort de Berlioz, de Franck à Debussy, après Debussy.

Sources

References

External links 
 Paul Landormy on Éditions Gallimard
 Paul Landormy on Encyclopédie Larousse
 A History of Music on Quiesta
 Landormy, Paul (1869-1943) on National Library of Australia

People from Issy-les-Moulineaux
1869 births
École Normale Supérieure alumni
19th-century French musicologists
20th-century French musicologists
French biographers
1943 deaths